Hellifield is a village and civil parish in the Craven district of North Yorkshire, England. Historically part of the West Riding of Yorkshire, the village was once an important railway junction on the Settle-Carlisle Railway between the Midland Railway and the Lancashire and Yorkshire Railway, but Hellifield railway station is now a shadow of its former glory. It is situated on the A65, between Skipton and Settle. Hellifield had a population of 1,060 residents at the 2001 census, increasing to 1,426 at the 2011 census.

History
In the Domesday Book of 1086, Hellifield is mentioned as Helgeflet; meaning 'Holy Marsh or Stream', translated from Anglo-Saxon, the village also could have been dedicated to the Anglo-Saxon Goddess 'Hel'. There is also the possibility that the name derives from the Norse 'The Farm of Helgi'. The village name changed over the years; in the 12th century, Hellifield was referred to as "Nether Hellifield" and in the 17th and 18th centuries the village was named "Hellifield Pele" and slightly later "Hellifield Cochins". The modern spelling of Hellifield appears in the mid-19th century, on maps and drawings.

In medieval times it seems that the area between Hellifield and Long Preston was hunted by wolves, so men were employed to guide travellers between the two settlements. Livestock suffered until the extinction in Britain of the grey wolf.

Hellifield was historically a township in the ancient parish of Long Preston in the West Riding of Yorkshire. It became a separate civil parish in 1866.

In the mid-19th century, the village was nothing more than a hamlet. The local workforce mainly concentrated within agriculture and associated trades.

Cotton weaving did take place in the village and several weaving sheds were constructed in the area.

During the 19th century, the railway revolution reached the village, which dramatically changed the growth and population changes of the small hamlet. The original railway station was located on Haw Lane, but in 1880 a new station replaced the old one. This coincided with the opening of the Lancashire and Yorkshire Railway Company's new line from Blackburn to Hellifield. This line and the Midland Railway's Settle to Carlisle Railway (opened 1876), turned Hellifield into a major passenger and freight interchange. Consequently, many houses and streets were built in the early 20th century to house a large railway population.

The Methodist Church in Haw Grove was opened in 1893. Part of the church, known as the Wesley Centre, now serves as a community centre.

Regular passenger services to Blackburn were cut in 1962, and the Motive Power Depot closed in 1963. New houses were constructed on top of previous railway land and the auction mart.

Hellifield was transferred to the new county of North Yorkshire in 1974. In 2014 the small former civil parishes of Nappa and Swinden were added to the parish.

Governance
Hellifield is a major part of the electoral ward called Hellifield and Long Preston. Its population at the 2011 census was 2,168.

Hellifield today 
The Hellifield Flashes (Yorkshire dialect for a pond in a field) are part of the village life and history. There are three flashes. The largest is Hellifield Flash or Gallaber Lake, the second Dunbars and the smallest is known as either Little Dunbars or Dunbars 2. The Flashes provide habitat for wildfowl and migratory birds.  This important area provides a sanctuary for 12 species on the RSPB "red list'.  Where once wolves roamed, now a wildlife habitat reigns.  However, the land is under threat from development and villagers desperate to preserve their countryside are fighting hard to prevent any further development.  The birdlife is monitored regularly by the RSPB and features high on the 'must visit' list of ornithologists.

Hellifield nestles on the edge of the Yorkshire Dales National Park and is surrounded by rolling hills, dry stone walls and agricultural land.

A proposal to build a  bypass for the A65 around Hellifield and Long Preston has been in discussion since the end of the Second World War. The project was the subject of an inquiry in 1992 – 1993 and an archaeological survey. A decision to de-trunk the route in 2006 means that if the bypass were to go ahead, it would have to be funded by the county council.

References

External links 

 Hellifield Homepage
 Hellifield Community Primary School Website
 Craven District Website

Villages in North Yorkshire
Civil parishes in North Yorkshire
Ribblesdale